Wreckamovie was a collaborative film production platform to allow individuals to set up a film production and find a community to collaborate with, or find others' interesting film productions and become a collaborator in a worknet. Its aim is to make filmmaking easier, more effective and possible for everyone.

History
Star Wreck Studios Oy Ltd and Wreckamovie were created by a group of filmmakers from Finland, who in 2005 created the freely downloadable Star Trek parody movie Star Wreck: In the Pirkinning. It gained web fame for being created and distributed by a community of enthusiasts over the internet, and for its special effects only made on a shoestring budget using standard home computers. The experiences of the group creating the aforementioned film, their first feature film, led them to develop a platform that's open and easy to use for everyone.

Characteristics
Wreckamovie is considered a model example of the potential of Web 2.0 according to Cisco Systems Finland Oy. As a business model it presents the exact opposite of the traditional way of making movies. With it a community creates and distributes the film, and only then, once popularity has already been gained, profitability steps in.

Wreckamovie serves all kinds of audiovisual productions, from short films and music videos to feature-length films. The concept is that anyone can build a community for a movie or any audiovisual project, and ask for assistance in desired tasks for the production. The service makes it possible to produce films together with the community, and thus to create a real interaction with the audience from the development stage.

The service doesn't distinguish between "professionals" and "amateurs", but emphasizes on enthusiasm.

In addition to online distribution, the creators want to distribute movies in every possible way, ranging from traditional movie screens to cell phones. Then the existing community serves as a strong potential base for viral marketing.

Current users
On 16 October 2009 Wreckamovie was being used for the production of the reference movie for the service, a full-length scifi parody Iron Sky. It was earlier used for the now accomplished Finnish horror film Sauna. The platform is open for service in general. There were more than 300 active projects listed on Wreckamovie in 2009.

Awards
In 2008 the movie production community Wreck-A-Movie was elected the winner of the MindTrek Grand Prix 2008, €20 008. In October 2009 Wreckamovie was chosen among the 36 finalists in SIME conference's Rising Star of the North -competition, finishing 23rd overall.

See also
Star Wreck: In the Pirkinning, the originating point for Wreckamovie
Iron Sky, the first movie fully utilizing Wreckamovie
Collaborative software
Collective intelligence
Crowdsourcing
Viral marketing
Web 2.0
Worknet

References

External links 
 

Film organisations in Finland
Collaborative projects
Collaborative software
Crowdsourcing
Finnish film producers
Groupware
Social information processing
Defunct social networking services